Gonaïves is a commune in northern Haiti, and the capital of the Artibonite department of Haiti. It has a population of about 300,000 people, but current statistics are unclear, as there has been no census since 2003.

History

The city of Gonaïves was founded around 1422 by a group of Taíno, who named it Gonaibo (to designate a locality of cacicat of the Jaragua). The Gulf of Gonâve is named after the town.

In 1802, an important battle of the Haitian Revolution, the Battle of Ravine-à-Couleuvres was fought near Gonaïves.

Gonaïves is also known as Haiti's city of independence, because it was the location of Jean-Jacques Dessalines declaring Haiti independent from France on January 1, 1804, by reading the Act of Independence, drafted by Boisrond Tonnerre, on the Place d'Armes of the town.
Marie-Claire Heureuse Félicité, the wife of Jean-Jacques Dessalines, died here in August 1858.

In the early 2000s, Gonaïves was the scene of substantial rioting and violence motivated primarily by opposition to President Jean-Bertrand Aristide, and on February 5, 2004, a group calling itself the Revolutionary Artibonite Resistance Front seized control of the city, starting the 2004 Haïtian rebellion. But in recent years, the city has seen a complete return to order.

Even compared with other Haitian port cities, Gonaïves has long been vulnerable to hurricanes due to its location in a flood plain and due to the surrounding unforested mountains. In September 2004, Hurricane Jeanne caused major flooding and mudslides in the city. Four years later, the city was again devastated by another storm, Hurricane Hanna, which killed 529 people, mostly in flooded sections of Gonaïves, where the destruction was described as "catastrophic" and 495 bodies were discovered as late as September 5. Haitian authorities said the tally would grow once officials were able to make their way through the city. "The assessment was only partial, because it was impossible to enter the city at that moment". Gonaïves Mayor Stephen Moise said at least 48,000 people from the Gonaïves area were forced into shelters.

In 2020, President Jovenel Moïse skipped a traditional visit to Gonaïves during a climate of violence. According to local media, an armed group targeted Prime Minister Ariel Henry's visit on 1 January 2022, resulting in one death and two injuries.

Education

University
Gonaives has some training centers of which the Université Publique de l'Artibonite aux Gonaïves (UPAG); and 
The Law and Economics School of Gonaives.

Health
Gonaives is home to the recently renovated La Providence Hospital.

Sport

Gonaives has some major league teams of which Eclair AC and Racing FC (Gonaives).

Media
Radio SuperXtraL'unique 94.1 FM
Radio Motivation Fm Listen Live - 95.5 MHz FM, Gonaïves, Haiti
Radio Boss Haiti 103.9 FM - The Radio of the moment.
Radio Redemption 100.9 FM
Radio Xplosion 96.5 FM
Radio Tele Satelite FM - 100.5 FM
Tele Radio new star fm 99.9 Chaine 13
Radio Continentale 99.5 FM
Radio Sun 91.3 FM
Radio Independence 101.5 FM  stations affiliées: radio Metropole 100.1, Lavwadlamerik
Radio Mega Max 95.9 FM
Radio Kiss FM 96.9
Radio Provinciale 95.3 FM
Radio Pyramide FM
Radio Trans-Artibonite
Radio Gonaïves 97.7 FM
Radio Trans Atlantique 102.5 FM
Radio Etincelle
Radio Nouvelle Vision Chrétienne
Radio Intrepide 97.3 FM
Radio Tambou FM
Radio Express FM
Radio Classic Inter FM
Radio 4VEG FM
Radio Espace FM
Radio KL 2000 FM
Radio Super Vision FM
Radio Megamax FM
Radio Main Dans La Main FM
Radio Clarté 103.9 FM
Radio Vision 2000 98.1 FM
Radio Télé 2004 (101.1FM)

Notable people
 

Ralph Chapoteau
Frantz Jean-Charles (born 1968), retired footballer
Ti Manno
Maurice Sixto

References

External links and further reading

Latortue, Paul R., "Gonaives: the last 50 years" Caribbean Studies, Vol. 34, Núm. 1, enero-junio, 2006, pp. 263–274 University of Puerto Rico, Puerto Rico

 
Populated places in Artibonite (department)
Gulf of Gonâve
Communes of Haiti
1422 establishments in North America
Populated places established in the 1420s
Port cities in the Caribbean